The Family Upstairs is a 1926 American silent comedy film.

The Family Upstairs may also refer to:

 The Dingbat Family, also known as The Family Upstairs, an American comic strip 1910–1916
 The Family Upstairs, a 1974 children's book by Janet McNeill
 The Family Upstairs, a 2019 novel by Lisa Jewell